Vinton County is a county located in the U.S. state of Ohio. As of the 2020 census, the population was 12,800, making it the least populous county in the state. Its county seat is McArthur. The county is named for Samuel Finley Vinton, US Representative from Ohio (1823–37, 1843–51).

Geography

Waterways
Most of Vinton County is in the Raccoon Creek watershed. Most of the rest of the county, to the west, is in the Salt Creek watershed.

Adjacent counties
 Hocking County (north)
 Athens County (northeast)
 Meigs County (east)
 Gallia County (southeast)
 Jackson County (south)
 Ross County (west)

Demographics

2000 census
As of the census of 2000, there were 12,806 people, 4,892 households, and 3,551 families residing in the county. The population density was 31 people per square mile (12/km2). There were 5,653 housing units at an average density of 14 per square mile (5/km2). The racial makeup of the county was 98.08% White, 0.35% Black or African American, 0.45% Native American, 0.09% Asian, 0.08% from other races, and 0.95% from two or more races. 0.47% of the population were Hispanic or Latino of any race.

There were 4,892 households, out of which 34.00% had children under the age of 18 living with them, 57.20% were married couples living together, 10.20% had a female householder with no husband present, and 27.40% were non-families. 23.60% of all households were made up of individuals, and 9.40% had someone living alone who was 65 years of age or older. The average household size was 2.59 and the average family size was 3.04.

In the county, the population was spread out, with 26.90% under the age of 18, 8.80% from 18 to 24, 29.00% from 25 to 44, 23.10% from 45 to 64, and 12.10% who were 65 years of age or older. The median age was 36 years. For every 100 females there were 99.10 males. For every 100 females age 18 and over, there were 95.50 males.

The median income for a household in the county was $29,465, and the median income for a family was $34,371. Males had a median income of $30,936 versus $21,257 for females. The per capita income for the county was $13,731. About 15.10% of families and 20.00% of the population were below the poverty line, including 27.60% of those under age 18 and 13.50% of those age 65 or over.

2010 census
As of the 2010 United States Census, there were 13,435 people, 5,260 households, and 3,640 families residing in the county. The racial makeup of the county was 97.9% white, 0.4% American Indian, 0.3% black or African American, 0.2% Asian, 0.1% from other races, and 1.1% from two or more races. Those of Hispanic or Latino origin made up 0.5% of the population. In terms of ancestry, 17.0% were German, 16.2% were American, 14.2% were Irish, and 7.5% were English.

Of the 5,260 households, 32.9% had children under the age of 18 living with them, 51.0% were married couples living together, 12.1% had a female householder with no husband present, 30.8% were non-families, and 26.1% of all households were made up of individuals. The average household size was 2.54 and the average family size was 3.03. The median age was 39.6 years.

The median income for a household in the county was $34,242 and the median income for a family was $37,409. Males had a median income of $36,598 versus $28,226 for females. The per capita income for the county was $16,736. About 17.3% of families and 19.5% of the population were below the poverty line, including 25.8% of those under age 18 and 13.3% of those age 65 or over.

Politics

Vinton County is typically a Republican county in presidential elections, having picked the GOP candidate in 12 of the last 16 elections.

|}

Government and infrastructure
Vinton County has a three-member Board of County Commissioners that administers and oversees the various county departments, similar to all but two of the 88 Ohio counties. The elected commissioners serve four-year terms. The elected commissioners are Tim Eberts, Mark Fout, and William Wellman.

Emergency services
The following emergency services, with their locations, serve the county:
 Ohio State Highway Patrol
 Vinton County Sheriff's Department
 31835 OH-93, McArthur
 McArthur Police Department
 124 West Main Street, McArthur
 Vinton County Emergency Medical Services
 31931 State Route 93, McArthur
 Vinton County Emergency Management Agency
 31835 OH-93, McArthur
 MedFlight 3
 110 West Second Street, Wellston, Ohio 45692
 LifeAir
 1843 River Road, Chillicothe, Ohio
 McArthur Fire Department
 303 West High Street, McArthur
 Hamden Fire Department
 100 Wilkesville Street, Hamden
 Wilkesville Fire Department
 161 Main Street, Wilkesville
 Zaleski Fire Department
 State Route 278, Zaleski
 Harrison Township Fire Department
 51560 Old Route 50, Londonderry

Post Offices
There are post offices in the following Vinton County communities:
 Hamden
 McArthur
 New Plymouth
 Ray
 Wilkesville
 Zaleski
 Wellston
 Jackson

Utilities
The following utilities serve Vinton County:

Phone, Internet and cable
 Horizon Telephone
 Ohio Hills
 Frognet
 Verizon
 First Communications
 Time Warner Cable
Frontier

Gas and electricity
 Columbia Gas of Ohio
 South Central Power Company
 American Electric Power
 Buckeye Rural Electric Co-Op

Water and garbage disposal
 Ross County Water Company
 Jackson County Water Company
 Leax Water Company
 McArthur Water Department
 Rumpke
 Waste Management
 Dutcher Sanitation

Education
The entire county is served by the Vinton County Local School District which operates the following schools:
 West Elementary
 57750 US Highway 50, Allensville, Ohio 45651
 South Elementary
 38234 State Route 93, Hamden, Ohio 45634
 Central Elementary
 507 Jefferson Avenue, McArthur, Ohio 45651
 Vinton County Middle School
 63780 Locker Plant Road, McArthur, Ohio 45651
 Vinton County High School
 63910 US Highway 50, McArthur, Ohio 45651

Transportation

Highways

  U.S. Route 50
  State Route 32
  State Route 56
  State Route 93
  State Route 124
  State Route 160
  State Route 278
  State Route 324
  State Route 327
  State Route 328
  State Route 356
  State Route 671
  State Route 677
  State Route 683
  State Route 689

Airports
Vinton County has one public airport, the Vinton County Airport (K22I/22I). The runway is a 3725' x 75' asphalt, east–west (09/27) runway with a single intersecting taxiway. Navigation and radio equipment includes a two-light PAPI for runway 27, Pilot Controlled Lighting and UNICOM.

The airport is leased to the Vinton County Pilots & Booster Association by the county, who raise funds to maintain and update the airport. , the boosters are raising funds to finance a 2000-foot runway extension and resurfacing project. The airport is equipped to provide basic service to piston-engined general aviation aircraft. Flight instruction services are also available.

Media
Vinton County is served by one local newspaper outlet, The Courier, a print newspaper and website.

Tourism

Covered bridges

There are four covered bridges located around Vinton County. The most famous bridge was the Ponn Bridge, also known as the Humpback Bridge. It was built in 1874 and was the longest one in the county. The bridge's name came from the shape of the bridge and there are only a few 'humpback' bridges left around the world. This bridge was burned down in June, 2013 by arsonists. In 1875, the Mt. Olive Bridge was built by a Civil War veteran named George Washington Pilcher. This bridge is open to foot traffic and goes over the Middle Fork Salt Creek. The Bay Bridge is located on the Vinton County Fairgrounds. It was moved to the fairgrounds in 1967 and is still open to pedestrians. The Cox Bridge was built in 1884. The bridge is open to foot traffic and has a picnic area near it. The Arbaugh Bridge was built in 1871, making it the oldest covered bridge in the county. The bridge is the only one open to vehicles thanks to a grant that allowed for renovations.

State Parks and Recreation Areas

There are eight recreation areas in Vinton County. The state parks consist of Lake Alma State Park located in Wellston, Ohio and Lake Hope State Park located in McArthur, Ohio. There are also four state forests consisting of Richland Furnace State Forest, Tar Hollow State Forest, Vinton Furnace State Forest, and Zaleski State Forest. Along with these, there is the Wayne National Forest, which covers many other counties in Ohio besides Vinton County, Raccoon Ecological Management Area located on State Route 160, and the Wellston Wildlife Area and Lake Rupert located on State Route 683. There are also many more public areas within a short distance of Vinton County. Vinton county is more than 70 percent wooded.

Hocking Hills Region 
The Hocking Hills Region is located north of Vinton County. Due to the Hocking Hills’ mainstream popularity, visitors often choose to book lodging in Vinton County to avoid the crowds.

Lake Hope Bike Trails
Lake Hope State Park is located in Vinton and Athens Counties. There are five loop trails in the park ranging from 4.5 miles to 16 miles. The Hope Furnace Trail loop is the shortest of the trails at 4.5 miles. The Sidewinder Loop is 5.5 miles, the Copperhead Loop is 10 miles, and the New Big Loop is 15 miles. The longest of the trails in the Old Big Loop at 16 miles.

Zaleski Backpack Trails

There are two trails in Zaleski State Forest, a trail of 23.5 miles and a day trail of 10 miles.

Moonville Rail-Trail
Moonville Rail-Trail is a 16-mile rail trail that follows an abandoned B&O railroad line from Mineral to Zaleski. It gets its name from the ghost town of Moonville and passes through a brick railroad tunnel at Moonville and a wooden railroad tunnel at King’s Hollow. The trail cuts through Zaleski State Forest and goes through many woodlands and wetlands. The Moonville Rail Trail Association, a local nonprofit organization established in April 2001, is currently working to make the trail more accessible by replacing bridges that were removed when the railroad was abandoned in the 1980s. The association meets at 6:30 p.m. every third Tuesday of the month at Hope Schoolhouse on Wheelabout Road.

Quilt barns
Throughout Vinton County, 27 quilt barns are scattered by the roadways. They are located on Vinton County's Quilt Trail.

Events

Wild Turkey Festival
The Wild Turkey Festival is a music festival held in McArthur, Ohio, on the first weekend of May, beginning on the Thursday evening and concluding on the Sunday afternoon. A parade runs through the town on the Saturday night.

Ridgetop Music Festival
Every August, the Ridgetop Music Festival is held at the Vinton County Airport which offers music and airplane rides throughout the festival.

Vinton County Air Show
The air show is held on the third Sunday in September. The show is the biggest free air show in Ohio and includes food and aerial acts.

Midnight At Moonville
Midnight at Moonville is one-day Halloween-themed festival featuring dramatic storytelling, wagon rides, regional craft vendors, souvenirs, historical presentations, and music performances located at the Moonville Tunnel. The 2020 edition of Midnight at Moonville was cancelled due to COVID-19.

Communities

Villages
 Hamden
 McArthur (county seat)
 Wilkesville
 Zaleski

Townships

 Brown
 Clinton
 Eagle
 Elk
 Harrison
 Jackson
 Knox
 Madison
 Richland
 Swan
 Vinton
 Wilkesville

Unincorporated communities

 Allensville
 Creola
 Dundas
 Eagle Mills
 Hawks
 Hope
 Hue
 Jimtown
 Knox
 Minerton
 New Plymouth
 Orland
 Prattsville
 Puritan
 Radcliff
 Ratcliffburg
 Ray
 Siverly
 Stella
 Vales Mills
 Tiffin, Ohio

Ghost towns
 Ingham
 Moonville
 Oreton
 Richland
 Vinton Furnace

See also
 Covered bridges of southeast Ohio
 National Register of Historic Places listings in Vinton County, Ohio

References

External links
 Vinton County Government Website
 Vinton County Convention and Visitors Bureau
 Herbert Wescoat Memorial Library serving Vinton County
 Public Lands Map of Vinton County

 
Appalachian Ohio
Counties of Appalachia
1850 establishments in Ohio
Populated places established in 1850